Larry Sewell (born 16 August 1948) is a New Zealand former cricketer. He played three List A matches for Auckland between 1974 and 1977.

See also
 List of Auckland representative cricketers

References

External links
 

1948 births
Living people
New Zealand cricketers
Auckland cricketers
Cricketers from Auckland